Grigory Aleksandrovich Gamarnik (April 22, 1929 – April 18, 2018) was a world champion wrestler and the first Greco-Roman wrestling world champion from Ukraine.

Biography
Gamarnik was Jewish, and was born in Zinovievsk (today's Kropyvnytskyi), Ukraine, in the Soviet Union. He was trained by USSR wrestling trainers German Sandler and Armenak Yaltyryan.

Wrestling career
In 1948, he won second place in light middleweight class wrestling, at the All-Union Youth Contests in the USSR.

Gamarnik was world lightweight (67 kg) Greco-Roman wrestling champion at the 1955 World Wrestling Championships in Karlsruhe, Germany, beating out silver medalist Kyösti Lehtonen of Finland and bronze medalist Gustav Freij of Sweden.  He came in second in the 1958 World Wrestling Championships in Budapest, Hungary, in welterweight (73 kg) Greco-Roman wrestling, behind gold medalist Kazim Ayvaz of Turkey and ahead of bronze medalist Valeriu Bularca of Romania.

He came in fifth in the 1960 Summer Olympics in Rome, Italy, in men's welterweight Greco-Roman wrestling.  Gamarnik was also a USSR wrestling champion in 1953, and in 1956–58.

Retirement
After retiring from competitions, Gamarnik was the Ukrainian National Coach from 1970 to 1991. He also served as a President of Greco-Roman Federation, was a FILA International referee since 1979, officiated at the Moscow Olympic Games (1980), and was one of the organizers of the FILA World Cup in 1983 in Kiev, Ukraine.
For his many years of commitment, Grigory Gamarnik was awarded the FILA Gold Star (1983) by then president Milan Ercegan.

Grigory Gamarnik was inducted into the International Jewish Sports Hall of Fame in 2020.

See also
 List of select Jewish wrestlers

References

External links
 

1929 births
2018 deaths
Olympic wrestlers of the Soviet Union
Wrestlers at the 1960 Summer Olympics
Soviet male sport wrestlers
Ukrainian male sport wrestlers
Jewish wrestlers
Soviet Jews
Jewish Ukrainian sportspeople
Sportspeople from Kropyvnytskyi
World Wrestling Championships medalists
National University of Ukraine on Physical Education and Sport alumni